In geometry, Dinostratus' theorem describes a property of Hippias' trisectrix, that allows for the squaring the circle if the trisectrix can be used in addition to straightedge and compass. The theorem is named after the Greek mathematician Dinostratus who proved it around 350 BC when he attempted to square the circle himself.

Arbitrary points on Hippias' trisectrix itself however cannot be constructed by circle and compass alone but only a dense subset. In particular it is not possible to construct the exact point where the trisectrix meets the edge of the square. For this reason Dinostratus' approach is not considered a "real" solution of the classical problem of squaring the circle.

References 

 Thomas Little Heath: A History of Greek Mathematics. Volume 1. From Thales to Euclid. Clarendon Press 1921 (Nachdruck Elibron Classics 2006), S. 225–230
 Horst Hischer: Klassische Probleme der Antike – Beispiele zur „Historischen Verankerung“. In: Blankenagel, Jürgen & Spiegel, Wolfgang (Hrsg.): Mathematikdidaktik aus Begeisterung für die Mathematik — Festschrift für Harald Scheid. Stuttgart/Düsseldorf/Leipzig: Klett 2000, S. 97–118 (German).

Pi
Euclidean plane geometry